Patrick Marshall (1869 – November 1950) was a geologist who lived in New Zealand.

Early life
Marshall was born on 22 December 1869 in Sapiston, Suffolk to Emily Louisa Merielina Rogers and her husband, John Hannath Marshall, cricketer and vicar of Sapiston. After his father's failing health the family emigrated to Kaiteriteri, New Zealand in 1876.

Sporting career 
Marshall won the men's doubles at the New Zealand national tennis championships with his brother Joy in 1893–94. He played three first-class cricket matches for Auckland in the 1900–01 season.

Bibliography 
Articles by Patrick Marshall published in Transactions and Proceedings of the Royal Society of New Zealand:
 Marshall P. (1894). "Tridymite-Trachyte of Lyttelton". Transactions and Proceedings of the Royal Society of New Zealand 26: 368–387.
 (1895) "New Zealand Diptera: No. 1". 28
 (1895). "On Dodonidia helmsi, Fereday". 28 (1901) "On Leaf-beds in the Kaikorai Valley". 34 (1902) "The Kingston Moraine".35 (1903) "Boulders in Triassic Conglomerate, Nelson". 36 (1904) "Magnesian Rocks at Milford Sound". 37 (1905) "Geological Notes on the Country North-west of Lake Wakatipu". 38 (1907) "Geology of Centre and North of North Island". 40 (1907) "Note on the Gabbro of the Dun Mountain". 40: 320–322.
 (1908) "Geology of Rarotonga and Aitutaki". 41 (1908) "Contact Rocks from West Nelson". 41 (1908) "Crater of Ngauruhoe". 41 (1908) "Additions to the List of New Zealand Minerals". 41 (1908) "Some New Zealand Fossil Cephalopods". 41 (1909) "Note on the Geology of Mangaia". 42 (1909) "The Glaciation of New Zealand". 42 Marshall P., Speight R. & Cotton C. A. (1910) "The Younger Rock-series of New Zealand". 43 (1911) "Nephelinite Rocks in New Zealand". 44 (1912) "Note on the Rate of Erosion of the Hooker and Mueller Glaciers". 45 Marshall P. & Uttley G. H. (1912) "Some Localities for Fossils at Oamaru". 45: 297–307.
 (1913) "Notes on the Geology of Moorea and Rurutu Islands". 46 (1913) "The Geology of the Cape Runaway District". 46 Marshall P. & Uttley G. H. (1913) "Localities for Fossils near Oamaru". 46: 279–280.
 (1914) "The Geology of Tahiti". 47 (1914) "Cainozoic Fossils from Oamaru". 47 (1914) "The Recent Volcanic Eruptions on Ambrym Island". 47 (1915) "The Younger Limestones of New Zealand". 48 (1915) "Some New Fossil Gastropods". 48 (1916) "Geology of the Central Kaipara". 49 (1916) "The Wangaloa Beds". 49 (1916) "Additional Fossils from Target Gully, near Oamaru". 49 (1916) "Fossils and Age of the Hampden (Onekakara) Beds". 49 Marshall P. (1918). "The Tertiary Molluscan Fauna of Pakaurangi Point. Kaipara Harbour". Transactions and Proceedings of the Royal Society of New Zealand 50: 263–278.
 (1918) "Notes on the Geology of the Tubuai Islands and of Pitcairn". 50 (1919) "Fauna of the Hampden Beds and Classification of the Oamaru System". 51 (1919) "Occurrence of Fossil Moa-bones in the Lower Wanganui Strata". 51 Marshall P. & Murdoch R. (1919) "Some New Fossil Species of Mollusca". 51: 253–258.
 (1920) "The Tawhiti Series, East Cape District". 52 (1920) "The Hampden Beds and the New Zealand Tertiary Limestones". 52 Marshall P. & Murdoch R. (1920) "The Tertiary Rocks near Wanganui". 52 Marshall P. & Murdoch R. (1921) "Tertiary Rocks near Hawera". 53 Marshall P. & Murdoch R. (1921) "Some Tertiary Mollusca, with Descriptions of New Species". 53: 77–84
 Marshall P. (1923) "Early Tertiary Molluscan Faunas of New Zealand". 54 Marshall P. & Murdoch R. (1923) "Some Tertiary Mollusca, with Descriptions of New Species". 54: 121–128
 Marshall P. & Murdoch R. (1923) "The Occurrence of the Genus Lahillia in New Zealand". 54 (1924) "Two Fossil Cephalopods from North Canterbury". 55 Marshall P. & Murdoch R. (1924) "The Tertiary Rocks of the Wanganui – South Taranaki Coast". 55 (1926) "Presidential Address". 56 (1926) "The Upper Cretaceous Ammonites of New Zealand". 56 (1926) "A New Species of Osmundites from Kawhia, New Zealand". 56 (1927) "The Origin of Lake Waikaremoana". 57 (1928) "The Wearing of Beach Gravels". 58 (1928) "A Kaipara Ammonite". 58 (1928) "A Natrolite Tinguaite from Dunedin". 58 (1928) "Colloid Substances formed by Abrasion". 59 (1930) "Beach Gravels and Sands". 60 (1935) "Acid Rocks of the Taupo-Rotorua Volcanic District". 64 (1937) "The Mineral Tuhualite." 66 (1937) "Geology of Mayor Island." 66'''

Books:
 Marshall P., Gregory J. W., Hamilton A. & Hogben G. (1905). The geography of New Zealand. Historical, physical, political, and commercial. Christchurch, Whitcombe and Tombs limited. 447 pp.
 Marshall P. (1912). New Zealand and adjacent islands. Heidelberg. 79 pp.

 Species described 
The World Register of Marine Species lists 38 marine species described by P. Marshall. Most of these are extinct.
 some Diptera
 † Conus abruptus Marshall, 1918
 † Paracomitas protransenna'' P. Marshall & R. Murdoch, 1923

See also
 List of Auckland representative cricketers

References

External links 
 
 bio
 works

20th-century New Zealand geologists
New Zealand paleontologists
New Zealand malacologists
New Zealand biologists
New Zealand zoologists
1869 births
1950 deaths
People educated at Whanganui Collegiate School
University of Canterbury alumni
University of Otago alumni
New Zealand cricketers
Auckland cricketers
New Zealand male tennis players
Presidents of the Royal Society of New Zealand
Academic staff of the Lincoln University (New Zealand)
English emigrants to New Zealand